The 1988 Stanley Cup Finals was the championship series of the National Hockey League's (NHL) 1987–88 season, and the culmination of the 1988 Stanley Cup playoffs. It was contested between the Edmonton Oilers and Boston Bruins. The Oilers would win the series in a four game sweep to win their fourth championship. This was the seventh of nine consecutive Finals contested by a team from Western Canada, sixth of eight by a team from Alberta (the Oilers appeared in six of them, the Calgary Flames in two, and the Vancouver Canucks in one), and the last of five consecutive Finals to end with the Cup presentation on Alberta ice (the Oilers won four such Cups, the Montreal Canadiens the other). The series is remembered for the power failure that occurred during game four at Boston Garden, which caused that game to be suspended. The league decided to replay game four at Northlands Coliseum in Edmonton, at the site, date and time that was originally scheduled for game five. Game 5 is also the final time that Wayne Gretzky appeared in an Edmonton Oilers uniform as he was traded to Los Angeles just prior to the next season.

Paths to the Finals

Edmonton defeated the Winnipeg Jets 4–1, the Calgary Flames 4–0 and the Detroit Red Wings 4–1 to reach the Finals.

Boston defeated the Buffalo Sabres 4–2, the Montreal Canadiens 4–1 and the New Jersey Devils 4–3 to reach the Finals.

Game summaries
The Finals pitted the Oilers' offensive juggernaut against the Bruins' more balanced team. The Oilers showed their defensive prowess, surrendering just nine goals in the four completed games. Ray Bourque was physical in defending against Gretzky, but that would not ground the "Great One" on his way to claiming his second Conn Smythe Trophy and setting playoff records with 31 assists in just 18 games, and 13 points in the Finals series.

Game one
Summary

Game two
Summary

Game three
Summary

Game four (suspended)
Glenn Anderson set a new record for quickest goal from the start of a Finals game when he scored ten seconds into the contest. That record was tied two years later in the third game of the  Finals by John Byce who, in a twist, was playing for the Bruins against the Oilers. Fog interfered with the game, requiring stoppages during the second period so that all 40+ players could skate around the ice to clear it away. The Oilers scored with 3:23 left in the second period, tying the game at 3–3, then the arena suffered a power failure before the ensuing face-off. The teams were sent to their dressing room untilafter a very long delay and no change in the situationNHL President John Ziegler Jr. announced that the game was suspended. Despite the game being suspended and replayed, Anderson's record is official.

Game four was subsequently rescheduled and moved to Edmonton, which was originally set to be the site of a game five if necessary. The Oilers won that game, sweeping the series and winning their fourth Stanley Cup in five years. Had the Bruins extended the series to the full seven games, game five would have been played on the original date for game six in Boston, Edmonton would have hosted the rescheduled game six, and then game seven would have been played in Boston as the makeup game.

Game four
Summary

Series summary
Boston Bruins vs. Edmonton Oilers

Edmonton wins best-of-seven series 4–0

Team rosters
Years indicated in boldface under the "Finals appearance" column signify that the player won the Stanley Cup in the given year.

Boston Bruins

Edmonton Oilers

Stanley Cup engraving
The 1988 Stanley Cup was presented to Oilers captain Wayne Gretzky by NHL President John Ziegler following the Oilers 6–3 win over the Bruins in game four.

The following Oilers players and staff had their names engraved on the Stanley Cup

1987–88 Edmonton Oilers

Broadcasting
In the United States, this was the final year under ESPN's national three-year deal. Under the U.S. TV contracts that would take effect beginning next season, SportsChannel America would take over as the NHL's American television partner.

ESPN's coverage of the 1988 Cup Finals was blacked out locally in the Boston area due to WSBK and NESN's local rights to Bruins games.

In Canada, this was the second and final year that the English-language rights to the Cup Finals was split between the Global-Canwest consortium and the CBC. Global aired games one and two. The CBC aired game three, then both the original and replayed game fours. CBC had the rights to game 5 of the Stanley Cup Finals, and Canwest/Global also had the rights to games 6 & 7 of the Stanley Cup Finals between Edmonton Oilers and Boston Bruins (both CBC and Canwest/Global had the rights of Game 7, using separate production facilities and separate on-air talent), which were not necessary.

See also
 1987–88 NHL season
 List of Stanley Cup champions

Notes

Footnotes

References

Further reading
CBC Archives 1988 Stanley Cup Finals Blackout in Boston

 
Stan
Boston Bruins games
Edmonton Oilers games
Stanley Cup Finals
Stanley Cup Finals
Ice hockey competitions in Boston
Ice hockey competitions in Edmonton
Stanley Cup Finals
Stanley Cup Finals
1980s in Edmonton